Of the 917 goals scored in matches at the eight final tournaments of the FIFA Women's World Cup, only 25 have been own goals. In 1997, FIFA published guidelines for classifying an own goal as "when a player plays the ball directly into his own net or when he redirects an opponent’s shot, cross or pass into his own goal", and excludes "shots that are on target (i.e. goal-bound) and touch a defender or rebound from the goal frame and bounce off a defender or goalkeeper". This is a list of all own goals scored during FIFA Women's World Cup matches (not including qualification games).

The United States has scored four own goals for their opponents, while Norway has benefited from four own goals. Of the 24 matches with own goals, the team scoring the own goal has won four times and drawn three times. All but six own goals have been scored in the group stage of the tournament.

The only player to score two own goals is Angie Ponce from Ecuador, scoring twice for Switzerland in 2015. She later scored Ecuador's first World Cup goals in the same match.

List

Notes

Statistics and notable own goals
Time
 First ever own goal
 Terry McCahill, New Zealand vs Norway, 1991.
 Fastest own goal
 Daiane, 2', Brazil vs United States, 2011.
 Latest regulation-time own goal
 Laura Bassett, 90+2', England vs Japan, 2015.
 Only own goal in a final match
 Julie Johnston, United States vs Japan, 2015.
 Only match with two own goals
 Ecuador vs Switzerland, 2015. Angie Ponce of Ecuador scored twice for Switzerland.
Tournament
 Most own goals, tournament
 8 (2019)
 Tournaments with no own goals
 1995
 Most own goals by a team in one tournament
 2,  (2015)
 Most own goals in favour of a team in one tournament
 2,  (2015),  (2015),  (2019)
Teams
 Most own goals by a team, overall
 4, 
 Most own goals in favour of a team, overall
 4, 
 Most matches, never scoring an own goal
44, 
 Most matches, never benefiting from an own goal
33, 
 Most matches, never scoring or benefiting from an own goal
33, 
 Only team to have scored multiple own goals for the same opponent
 Pairs of teams to have scored own goals for each other
Players
 Youngest player with an own goal
 Ifeanyi Chiejine, age 16, Nigeria vs United States, 1999
 Oldest player with an own goal
 Mônica, age 32, Brazil vs Australia, 2019
 Players who have scored own goals and regular goals
 Brandi Chastain of the United States scored against Germany in 1999
 Eva González of Argentina scored against England in 2007
 Trine Rønning of Norway scored against Thailand in 2015
 Angie Ponce of Ecuador scored against Switzerland in 2015
 Wendie Renard of France scored twice against South Korea, once against Nigeria, and once against the United States in 2019
 Julie Ertz (née Johnston) of the United States scored against Chile in 2019
 Players to score for both teams in a match
 Brandi Chastain, United States vs Germany, 1999
 Eva González, Argentina vs England, 2007
 Angie Ponce, Ecuador vs Switzerland, 2015 (two own goals, one regular goal)
Various
 The own goal scored by Brazilian Mônica for Australia in 2019 was the first own goal to be confirmed by VAR.
  has scored more own goals (two) than regular goals (one).
  has benefited from as many own goals (one) as regular goals (one).

By team

See also
 List of FIFA World Cup own goals
 List of UEFA European Championship own goals

Notes

References

Own goals
Own goals
Association football player non-biographical articles